Floracarus perrepae is a species of herbivorous mite belonging to the family Eriophyidae. It is native to Australia (Queensland), China and New Caledonia. As it is known to attack and eat the invasive fern species Lygodium microphyllum, it is being considered for use as a biological pest control agent in Florida.

References 

Eriophyidae
Invasive plants biological control agents
Arachnids of Asia
Arthropods of China
Fauna of New Caledonia
Arachnids of Australia
Animals described in 2002